Sherin Rai'd Kheiraldeen Al-Shalabe (born 3 June 1994) is a Jordanian footballer who plays as a goalkeeper for local Women's League club Shabab Al-Ordon and the Jordan women's national team.

References 

1994 births
Living people
Jordanian women's footballers
Jordan women's international footballers
Women's association football goalkeepers
Sportspeople from Amman
Jordan Women's Football League players